Abankeseso was the capital of the state of Denkyira in the 1690s, in part of what is today Ghana.

In 1692 Dutch, English and Brandenburger traders traveled to Abankeseso and set up trading relations with the Denkyirahene Boamponsem.

Sources
McCaskie, T. C. "Denkyira in the Making of Asante c. 1660-1720" The Journal of African History vol. 48 (2007) no. 1, p. 1

History of Ghana